Hotel Nikko Guam is a 5-star hotel in Tumon, Guam. It is operated by the Japanese hotelier firm Hotel Nikko.
It is located at the northernmost end of Tumon Bay next to Gun Beach.

References

External links
Official site 

Hotels in Guam